Grevillea nematophylla, commonly known as water bush or silver-leaved water bush, is a species of flowering plant in the family Proteaceae and is endemic to Australia. It is shrub or small tree with simple or pinnatisect leaves, the leaves or lobes linear, and branched, cylindrical clusters of cream-coloured flowers.

Description

Taxonomy
Grevillea nematophylla was first formally described in 1859 by Ferdinand von Mueller in Fragmenta Phytographiae Australiae from specimens collected by John Dallachy near the Murchison River. The specific epithet (nematophylla) means "thread-like leaved".

In 2000, Robert Owen Makinson described three subspecies of G. nematophylla in the Flora of Australia, and the names are accepted by the Australian Plant Census:

Distribution and habitat
Subspecies nematophylla grows along drainage lines and near soaks in the Avon Wheatbelt, Coolgardie, Great Victoria Desert, Murchison and Yalgoo bioregions of south-western Western Australia, in inland South Australia and southern parts of the Northern Territory. It was previously known from western New South Wales, but is now assumed to be extinct in that state.

Subspecies planicosta occurs in southern inland Western Australia from near Balladonia to the ranges north of Kalgoorlie and north-east of Laverton in the Coolgardie, Great Victoria Desert, Murchison, Nullarbor bioregions.

Subspecies supraplana is found from Meekatharra and Yalgoo to near Rawlinna in the Avon Wheatbelt, Great Victoria Desert, Murchison, Nullarbor and Yalgoo bioregions, and on the Nullarbor Plain in South Australia.

Conservation status
All three subspecies of G. nematophylla are listed as "not threatened", by the Western Australian Government Department of Biodiversity, Conservation and Attractions. The species is listed as "extinct" in New South Wales under the New South Wales Government Biodiversity Conservation Act 2016.

References

nematophylla
Flora of Western Australia
Flora of New South Wales
Flora of Queensland
Flora of South Australia
Flora of the Northern Territory
Proteales of Australia
Taxa named by Ferdinand von Mueller
Plants described in 1859